František "Franta" Štorm (born 3 July 1966) is a Czech musician, photographer, typographer, writer, teacher, artist, illustrator and record producer, famous for being the vocalist and a founding member of the black metal band Master's Hammer.

Biography
Štorm was born in Prague, in what was then Czechoslovakia, on 3 July 1966; he is the son of painter Dana Puchnarová, and grandson of architect and heraldist Břetislav Štorm. From 1981 to 1985 he studied at the Secondary School of Arts in Prague, and later went to the AAAD, where he graduated in 1991 under the guidance of Milan Hegar and Jan Solpera. After serving as Solpera's assistant for some years, from 2003 to 2008 Štorm was the headmaster of the AAAD's Department of Typography. In 1993 Štorm founded his own type foundry, which has, so far, produced more than sixty font families.

In 2005 Štorm won the Revolver Revue prize, and in 2009 he published his first book, Eseje o typografii (Essays on Typography), which was nominated to the Magnesia Litera award in the "Journalism" category but eventually lost to Radka Denemarková's Smrt, nebudeš se báti aneb Příběh Petra Lébla.

Štorm is, outside the area of typography, probably best known as the singer/guitarist of the legendary black metal band Master's Hammer, which was founded by him alongside two of his AAAD classmates, Milan Fibiger and Ferenc Feco, in 1987. Their debut album, Ritual., was released in 1991 and sold over 25,000 copies in the Czech Republic. After releasing their third album, Šlágry, in 1995, they broke up, but eventually reunited in 2009. In 2013, Štorm and his bandmates Honza "Silenthell" Přibyl and Tomáš "Necrocock" Kohout founded the record label Jihosound Records, which would release all subsequent Master's Hammer's albums. The band's most recent release was 2018's Fascinator. Štorm was also the vocalist of the band Airbrusher, founded after Master's Hammer's first demise; following the release of a self-titled album in 2007, their second album, Dirndl to Go, came out in 2021. Their third album, Latentní obrazy, came out in 2022. In 2015 he founded the side project Mortal Cabinet, which released an album, Necrotica, in the same year.

Štorm was responsible for the cover arts of Root's and Törr's 1990 debut albums Zjevení and Armageddon respectively, of Master's Hammer's albums since Vracejte konve na místo., and of Necrocock's solo albums Hudba z psychiatrických pavilonů and Houbařské album. He also illustrated an anthology of H. P. Lovecraft's complete works, in 5 volumes, published in the Czech Republic by Nakladatelství Plus between 2011 and 2013.

An enthusiast of the Indian culture, Štorm usually spends his time between his residence in South Bohemia and in the city of Margao, Goa, India, where he finds inspiration to most of his lyrical and musical themes.

Discography

With Master's Hammer
 ''For a more comprehensive list, see Master's Hammer#Discography

With Airbrusher

With Mortal Cabinet

References

External links
 Official website for original artwork
 
 Official Master's Hammer website
 Official Storm Type Foundry website
 Official Jihosound Records website

1966 births
Living people
Czech typographers and type designers
20th-century Czech male singers
Heavy metal guitarists
Czech drummers
Male drummers
Czech guitarists
Male guitarists
Lyricists
Czech artists
Photographers from Prague
Czech illustrators
Czech record producers
Musicians from Prague
Black metal singers
Album-cover and concert-poster artists
21st-century Czech male singers
Academy of Arts, Architecture and Design in Prague alumni